Lillian Hlavaty (June 13, 1932 – October 4, 2009) played in the All-American Girls Professional Baseball League in 1951.  She threw right-handed.  She was born and raised in Jessup, Pennsylvania, to Joseph and Helen Ritzco Hlavaty.

Batting record

References

1932 births
2009 deaths
All-American Girls Professional Baseball League players
Rockford Peaches players
20th-century American women
20th-century American people
People from Lackawanna County, Pennsylvania
21st-century American women